Betsan Llwyd is a Welsh actor and theatrical and television director.

In 2012 she was appointed Arts Director of Bara Caws.

She has been awarded actress awards by BAFTA Cymru in 1995 and in 2001.

She has enjoyed success in  the National Theatre of Wales with Ty Bernarda Alba and Y Pair and at Theatr Clwyd in Mold with  Salt, Root and Roe, Gas Light and Pygmalion  
On the Welsh television channel S4C she has been seen in  Sonbreros and Pen Talaras well as having frequent appearances in Pobol y Cwm a Welsh language soap opera. She features in the Welsh language version of BBC drama Keeping Faith on S4C, Un Bore Mercher, and has a regular role in Young Dracula for the BBC.

References

External links 
 

Welsh stage actresses
Welsh television actresses
Welsh soap opera actresses
20th-century Welsh actresses
21st-century Welsh actresses
Living people
Year of birth missing (living people)